Maurice Sydney "Moose" Harper (May 14, 1914 - August 22, 1987) was an American football center in the National Football League (NFL).  He played for the Philadelphia Eagles and the Pittsburgh Steelers.

Harper was born in Bandera, Texas.

References

 

1914 births
American football offensive linemen
American football defensive linemen
Philadelphia Eagles players
Pittsburgh Steelers players
People from Bandera, Texas
1993 deaths